William Harding (born c. 1625, date of death unknown), was the first person to have been convicted of witchcraft in the Colony of Virginia, and one of the few men to have been tried in a witch trial in Colonial America.

Background 
Wright was born around 1625 in England. He emigrated to British America and resided in Northumberland County. where he later was a landowner near Nomini Creek. He was described as a "cunning man" and a troublemaker who caused dissension.

Witch trial 

In November 1656, Scottish Reverend David Lindsay of Wicomico Church, Virginia accused William of witchcraft and sorcery, and he was subsequently imprisoned. A 24-member jury was convened, and the witch trial heard testimony from numerous county residents. All records regarding his charges have been lost.

On November 20, 1656, Harding was found guilty of the charges, sentenced to 13 whip lashes, ordered to pay all court costs, and formally banished from the county. Harding's banishment was considered unorthodox as it was not a prescribed punishment in the Witchcraft Act of 1603. His case was one of the few male witchcraft trials in the New World.

References 

1625 births
Virginia colonial people
History of Virginia
American witchcraft
Date of death unknown
English emigrants to British North America
People accused of witchcraft
People from Northumberland County, Virginia